Ramakant Bhargava (born 2 October 1953) is an Indian politician. He was elected to the Lok Sabha, lower house of the Parliament of India from Vidisha, Madhya Pradesh in the 2019 Indian general election as member of the Bharatiya Janata Party. and he is former Chaiman Markfed Madhya Pradesh and former Director Apex Bank, Madhya Pradesh.

References

External links
 Official biographical sketch in Parliament of India website

India MPs 2019–present
Lok Sabha members from Madhya Pradesh
Living people
Bharatiya Janata Party politicians from Madhya Pradesh
People from Vidisha
1953 births